Foch-Gilttoyees Provincial Park is a provincial park in British Columbia, Canada. The park and protected area encompasses  of coastal terrain from sea level up to alpine. The park contains part of the historical First Nations travel path between the Skeena River and the Douglas Channel. The remainder of the route is located in Gitnadoiks River Provincial Park. Together, the two parks provide a continuous protected corridor between the river and the channel.

References

North Coast of British Columbia
Provincial parks of British Columbia
2004 establishments in British Columbia